Heart Kent (previously Invicta FM) was a local radio station owned and operated by Global Radio as part of the Heart network. It broadcast to Kent from studios at John Wilson Business Park in Whitstable.

History

Invicta in the 80s

Originally, independent local radio in Kent was to be provided by two franchisees, one covering Maidstone and Medway, and the other covering East Kent. The companies that were awarded the licences to broadcast to these areas were Northdown Radio and Network East Kent respectively. The two companies merged on 26 March 1984. The company's new name was taken from a failed bid for the East Kent licence, owned by former Radio 2 presenter Desmond Carrington, Radio Invicta Ltd. The new countywide station went on air as Invicta Sound at 6am on 1 October 1984.  The first few seconds of broadcasting were marred by a sound mix up which meant that Magnus's discussions with his production team were broadcast to the county.

The station output was described as "Radio 2 cum Radio 4", featuring a mix of middle-of-the-road music coupled with a prominent news schedule where a news bulletin would last at least nine minutes.

The managing director of the company Cecilia Garnett was sacked after the first few months.

The station was relaunched as Invicta Radio in spring 1985.

The company's studios, originally purchased by Desmond Carrington's Radio Invicta Ltd, were based in an old warehouse, at 15 Station Road East in Canterbury, with a second, smaller base at 37 Earl Street in Maidstone. Originally, presenters generally had the option of choosing where to present their show from, depending on where they lived. Plus, in the Invicta Sound days, there was some separate programming for East and West Kent, including dedicated Drivetime shows for each half of the county. Some specialist shows could only be heard by one half of the county, including a classical music show and a programme aimed at children, called "Kid's Stuff".

In 1985, a general reorganisation of radio frequencies in Britain forced Invicta into changing a number of them:
 103.8 MHz (West Kent) became 103.1 MHz
 95.1 MHz (East Kent) became 102.8 MHz
 96.3 MHz (Ashford) became 96.1 MHz
 95.9 MHz (Thanet) and 97.0 MHz (Folkestone and Dover) remained unchanged.

The lack of a single high-powered frequency for the east of the county was because of international frequency clearance problems due to the proximity to France across the English Channel. Instead three low-powered transmitters were installed in Ashford, Folkestone/Dover and Thanet. This problem did not affect BBC national and local radio, which use a single high-powered site at Swingate, near Dover.

A few years after the rebranding of the station to Invicta Radio, the station became known as Invicta FM. Soon after, separate breakfast shows started to be broadcast to the following areas:
 East Kent / West Kent (from 15 Station Road East, Canterbury, and later from Whitstable)
 Ashford (initially from the Ashford International Hotel, Ashford, then from Canterbury, and later from Whitstable)
 Thanet (from 15 Station Road East, Canterbury, and later from Whitstable)

Station split - the early years

As required by the Home Office to end simulcasting on FM and AM, in March 1989, Invicta Radio became Invicta FM and a sister station, Coast AM began broadcasting on Invicta's AM frequencies.  Whilst the company name remained Invicta Sound plc, the expanding operation started to become known as the Invicta Radio Group.

Coast AM was an AOR/soft rock station under the leadership of ex-Capital Producer/DJ Kerry Juby with music programmed by Paul Stafford (Head of Music and "Living on Rock" presenter, 711pm weekdays). Eammon Kelly was the station's first breakfast host. A few months after the launch, Coast AM was renamed "Coast Classics". (Although the jingles sang "Coast Classic"). The service began playing more 'oldies' and by 1990 it became a fully fledged 'Golden Oldies' station. Throughout this period, Coast was a 24-hour live local station, but in 1991 it started taking a "sustaining service" from Chiltern Radio Group's expanding AM 'Gold' service, SuperGold. As a result of this change, the station was renamed Invicta Supergold. This helped as research had shown that listeners never fully got used to the station's name, many still calling it Invicta.  A near-identical set of jingles from JAM were re-sung with the station's new name, and there were no major schedule changes. However, just before this change took place, and for most of Summer 1991, presenters at the station were instructed to call the station "Coast Classics Invicta Supergold" on air, to enable listeners to get used to the change. It became a highly popular station and once achieved a 17% reach in a JICRAR survey; some say much to the disgust of its Southern Radio bosses who, it has been said, preferred their AM stations to hover around the 9% mark.
It too lost its identity in 1998 when it became Capital Gold. As Invicta Supergold, the station performed very well and became home to ex Invicta FM presenters such as ex-breakfast presenter Johnny Lewis.

Invicta in the 90s

In 1991, controversy was sparked as one of the famous DJs, Chris Ryder (aka Caesar the Boogieman), was sacked over criminal charges related to theft from charity. He was ultimately found not guilty on these charges, but was convicted of intent to defraud

Also in 1991, the Maidstone studios and offices closed and a few months later, the entire company moved to a brand new, larger, building just outside Whitstable. This was due to the company getting too big for its Canterbury home having started to expand its radio operations beyond Kent. By now it had acquired a radio station in Frinton, Essex called Mellow 1557 (now known as Dream 100), as well as a stake in a radio station in Boulogne-sur-Mer, France, which it had relaunched as Continental Invicta FM. Some of Invicta FM's jingles were resung as "Continental FM" and voice overs appeared on the station by Invicta presenter Tim Stewart.

Shortly after moving to its current base, the station was acquired by Southern Radio plc which, in turn, was acquired by Capital Radio plc in May 1994. Mellow 1557 was sold by Southern Radio plc a few months after it took control of the Invicta Radio Group.

New rival commercial stations in the late 1990s were awarded licences in Kent by the Radio Authority. These were TLR (Thanet), Medway FM (Medway Towns), Neptune Radio (Shepway and Dover), CTFM (Canterbury and district) and KFM (Tonbridge and Sevenoaks). These new stations mainly adopted a much larger playlist of songs and, despite some major audiences successes (mainly Thanet) they gradually put extra pressure on Invicta's advertising revenue. Most of the stations also employed many familiar ex-Invicta presenters. These stations are all now known as KMFM following buyouts by the KM Group.

Station split - the later years

When Chiltern closed its SuperGold sustaining service, Invicta FM and Invicta Supergold began sharing a single programme overnight. It retained its own separate identity by the use of split FM/AM jingles and an hourly out-of-news separate pre-recorded weather forecast, read over the respective station's weather jingle. However, the presenter simply called it "Invicta" elsewhere in the hour. This usually ran from midnight or 1am until 6am, although the later launch of an "early breakfast" programme on Invicta FM meant the overnight presenter would do the last hour on Supergold only.

Invicta Supergold closed down May 1998, to be replaced by the mainly networked Capital Gold. The change happened with no promotion, save for a handful of promos scheduled to run over the weekend prior to the Monday launch. A local Drivetime show was retained, presented initially by Mike Peters, then Peter Fielding. This was ahead of the roll out of Capital Gold across other AM stations owned by the company; the Kent site acted as a test station, chosen in part because of its close proximity to Capital Gold in London, to ensure syndication worked, and to iron out any problems. Another change that occurred at the launch of Capital Gold in Kent is that for the first time, advertising was no longer split with different ads in the east and west of the county, as had been the case since 1984 - all ads now broadcast on the station are heard on both of the station's frequencies.

By September, Capital Gold could also be heard in Birmingham, Sussex, Hampshire and, not long after, South Wales. A while later, the decision was taken to network the Drivetime show (presented by Tony Blackburn and instead local breakfast shows would be broadcast on each of the local Capital Gold services. Kent's local opt-out show was then presented by Tim Stewart, who moved over from Invicta FM.

Ex-Radio 1 DJ Adrian John took over the Kent breakfast show in 2000.

A local breakfast show survived until August 2007, when Capital Gold owners GCap Media purchased the Classic Gold stations from UBC. Ofcom agreed a proposal to move the four-hour local opt-out from breakfast to afternoons. Kent's breakfast show host by now was Neil Winfield who left the station and ex-Invicta jock Russ Lowe came in to present the 12-4 slot on weekdays.  It was, and remains, pre-recorded ('voicetracked') and 'music heavy'. As it is recorded especially for the Kent audience of the now-renamed Gold; station, it is able to include occasional Kent information and other references to the county. Local news and travel remains in the Breakfast and Drivetime programmes, and local commercials are broadcast 24 hours a day. All other output is produced at the Gold studios at Leicester Square in London.

Invicta in the 00s

Capital Radio plc and GWR Group plc merged in 2005 and on 1 May that year, the newly enlarged group was renamed GCap Media plc. The first effects of the GCap merger were felt by Invicta FM soon afterwards. New boss Craig Boddy, assisted by GCap management (Hugh Murray and regional programme boss Peter Sinclair), undertook a radical restructure of the station in September 2005, in response to falling listening figures and mounting overheads. Boddy changed Invicta from the style influenced by nearby Capital FM, to one which roughly resembled the old Mix Network.  Invicta was possibly the last local radio station owned by the company (outside London) to be live and local 24/7*, escaping overnight networking and voicetracking at times when Capital Radio-owned stablemates like Ocean, Southern and Power succumbed to one or the other.

(*Excluding the short-lived Steve Penk late night show heard across the Capital FM network, a Sunday afternoon show presented by Cat Deeley and Edith Bowman, and the weekly chart show, currently known as 'The Big Top 40 Show')

The new relaunched Invicta carried the first of the GWR straplines 'The best mix of the 80s, 90s and today' from Monday 19 September 2005. The second strapline 'Today's Best Mix', was introduced on Bank Holiday Monday 28 August 2006.

In May 2008, both Craig Boddy and Regional Programme Director Peter Sinclair left and in July 2008 former Invicta FM and KMFM Programme Controller Mike Osborne was appointed to the newly created role of Programme Director

On 30 June 2008, following the relaxation of OFCOM regulations on networking, the new owners of GCap Media, Global Radio, cut minimum local programming to ten hours on weekdays (from 6 to 10am and 1 to 7pm) and four hours on Saturdays & Sundays (from 8am to 12pm). The changes signalled the end of some long-running programmes including Party Invicta and an increase in networked output, including the mid-morning show with Philippa Collins (aired from 10am to 1pm). Andy Walker presented the local 1pm4pm show until December 2008 when he was replaced by ex night time presenter Stephen Sullivan with Neil Kefford hosting the 4 pm7 pm slot.
In common with most of its sister stations, a lot of modern music and rocky/edgey music had by now been dropped by Invicta, in favour of a slightly and bigger concentration of older music, as far back to the late 1970s in a few cases and up to three 1980s songs an hour; sounding a bit like a younger version of another Global Radio station, Heart. All stations affected now shared the same playlist (e.g. Invicta FM played the same songs in the same order as sister station Essex FM).  The strapline also mirrored Heart's - More Music Variety - as did the name of the now renamed 'guess the year' feature, The Time Tunnel.

"Heart is coming", 2009

In September 2008, it was reported that Invicta, along with 28 other local radio stations, would be renamed as "Heart" with local programming reduced to Breakfast and Drivetime shows on weekdays and a four-hour show on Saturdays and Sundays. Whilst the station was still known on air as Invicta FM, airtime on the station was sold nationally as part of the Heart Network.

The station was amongst the final phase of stations to be rebranded, becoming Heart on 22 June 2009. Two months before the rebrand, the station was referred to as "The Heart of Kent". Two weeks before the rebrand, all references to the Invicta FM name were removed, and trailers advertising "Heart is coming" were played after every song. This changed to "Heart is here" following the rebrand.

Heart network programming is overseen by group programme director of the Heart network, Luis Clark, who was programme director of Invicta FM between 1999 and 2000.

Closure
On 26 February 2019, Global confirmed Heart Kent would be merged with sister stations in the south and south east of England by the end of the year.

Under relaxed OFCOM requirements for local content, the station is allowed to share all programmes with another six licences located in the ITV Meridian region, which previously broadcast under three Heart stations (Solent, Sussex and Surrey and Thames Valley).

As of June 2019, regional output on the merged 'Heart South' station consists of a three-hour Drivetime show on weekdays, alongside local news bulletins, traffic updates and advertising. Heart Kent's Whitstable studios closed with operations moving to studios at Fareham, Hampshire. Local breakfast and weekend shows were replaced with network programming from London.

Heart Kent ceased local broadcasting at 7pm on 31 May 2019. Heart South began broadcasting regional programming on 3 June 2019.

Breakfast shows over the years
For some time the station ran four breakfast shows from Whitstable - Invicta Supergold, Invicta FM (102.8 and 103.1 and in Dover on 97.0) Invicta FM Ashford (96.1) and Invicta FM Thanet (95.9). The different programmes all took the same news and sports bulletins but had different presenters.

The split FM breakfast was discontinued with the launch of The Invicta FM Morning Zoo in 1995. The Morning Zoo was the brainchild of then programme controller Sandy Beech.

For a time, commercial breaks continued to be split four ways on Invicta FM, with East, West, Thanet and Ashford as sub-regions.

The Morning Zoo was a fixture of the Invicta FM schedule for many years. Neil Francis was the initial lead presenter of the show until 2000 - he was later partnered with Sam Hughes (known on air simply as 'Sam'). He was also joined by Mark Fox( Mark Anthony) in the flying eye.

From 2000, James Heming was the lead presenter of the Morning Zoo following the departure of Neil Francis. The last Morning Zoo was broadcast on Friday 22 December 2006. The breakfast show was rebranded "James and Ali in the morning" at the beginning of 2007.

From May 2008, it was known as "James Heming in the morning", following Ali Wheeler's departure from the station to have her first child.  From November 2008 to December 2010, James had a new co host - Gemma Shepherd - and the show became known as "Invicta FM Breakfast with James and Gemma" and subsequently as "Heart Breakfast with James and Gemma".

James gained Charlie O'Brien as his new co host on 21 January, and their new show started on 24 January 2011. O'Brien left Heart on Christmas Eve 2014 and was replaced by Becky Ives. Both Hemming and Ives left Heart Kent on 24 May 2019, one week before the station ceased all local programming.

Notable former presenters

Local presenters

 Andy Archer
 Bam Bam (later at Galaxy 105, then Kiss 100 and Capital 95.8
 Paddy Bunce (now producer of The Big Top 40 Show)
 Dave Cash(deceased) (later at BBC Radio Kent)
 Roger Day (later at BBC Radio Kent)
 Don Durbridge (deceased)(previously at BBC Radio 1, later at BBC Radio Kent)
 Rick Edwards (later at Heart Torbay), now on BBC Radio Devon
 Caroline Feraday (later LBC 97.3, and BBC South East Today)
 Nino Firetto later Super Channel, later Exeter FM
 Dan Gasser - between 1997 and 1998, now at Radio X
 Nigel Harris (formerly at KMFM Shepway and White Cliffs Country) Currently at Radio Caroline

 Kerry Juby (Deceased)
 Johnny Lewis (went to TLR then KMFM)and now Academy FM (Thanet) & Radio Caroline
 Pete Tong (now at BBC Radio 1)

Networked presenters
 Edith Bowman (presented 'Cat and Edith's Hit Music Sunday')
 Rich Clarke (co-hosted 'The Vodafone Big Top 40' (syndicated), now at Heart Solent)
 Cat Deeley (presented 'Cat and Edith's Hit Music Sunday')
 Jason Donovan (presented All 80's)
 Caroline Flack (formerly presented Sunday mornings on Heart)
 Zoe Hardman (formerly presented weekday overnights)
 Ben Jones (presented overnights, now at BBC 3CR)
 Gethin Jones (formerly presented Sunday mornings on Heart)
 Myleene Klass (formerly hosted networked Sunday evening show) with Matt Brown
 Dannii Minogue (cover presenter on 'hit40uk')
 Stephen Mulhern
 Steve Penk (presented a late-night show across the Capital FM Network)
 Neil 'Roberto' Williams (now with Heart 80's)
 Emma Willis
 Mark Wright (formerly presented Club Classics on Friday and Saturday)

References

External links
 

Radio stations established in 1984
Kent
Radio stations in Kent
Defunct radio stations in the United Kingdom